Jessica Eliza Beer (born 20 October 1979) is a New Zealand fencer. She competed in the women's individual épée event at the 2004 Summer Olympics.

References

External links
 

1979 births
Living people
New Zealand female épée fencers
Olympic fencers of New Zealand
Fencers at the 2004 Summer Olympics
Sportspeople from Auckland